The Fish That Saved Pittsburgh is a 1979 American sports/fantasy comedy film directed by Gilbert Moses and coproduced by David Dashev and Gary Stromberg. It was produced by Lorimar and distributed by United Artists.

The film was shot on location in Pittsburgh and at Pittsburgh's Civic Arena, as well as in suburban Moon Township, Pennsylvania.

The film has attracted a cult following, most notably for its disco-inspired setting and soundtrack, as well as the appearances of many NBA stars (including lead actor Julius Erving) and early roles for Debbie Allen, Stockard Channing and Harry Shearer.  The film also contains a cameo by longtime Pittsburgh mayor Richard Caliguiri.

Plot

The Pittsburgh Pythons are a struggling professional basketball team whose continuous losing streak and lack of talent has made them the laughing stock of the city. Several players ask to be traded to other teams because of the bad publicity and the presence of difficult but highly paid star player Moses Guthrie.

Believing that the team needs a miracle, ballboy Tyrone Millman turns to astrology to improve the team's fortunes. He brings his idea to astrologer Mona Mondieu, and they devise the perfect concept: a team composed entirely of players born under Guthrie's astrological sign of Pisces. The team is reborn as the Pittsburgh Pisces.

Although Tyrone's sister and Guthrie think that the idea is absurd, they ultimately embrace the concept.  The plan succeeds because of the new team's eccentric skills, teamwork and Mona's astrological readings, culminating in a championship opportunity.

Production
Singer/actress Cher was originally cast as Mona Mondieu, but she withdrew at the last minute. Singer/actress Dee Dee Bridgewater, who plays Brandy, previously won a Tony Award for her role as Glinda in The Wiz on Broadway also under the direction of Gilbert Moses, whom she later married.

The Spinners recorded two songs for the film. Actress/choreographer Debbie Allen and athlete Norm Nixon, who married in 1984, both appear in the film.

Despite popular belief, Julius Erving's character's name of Moses was not chosen in reference to teammate Moses Malone, as Erving and Malone would not become teammates until four years later.

Novelization
A novelization written by Richard Woodley, based upon an early draft of the screenplay by Jaison Starkes and Edmond Stevens, was released in 1979. The novel differs in several respects from the film. In the film, the Pisces win every game, but in the novel, the team loses twice. The novel describes a group of people in wheelchairs causing havoc at a Pisces game, a scene that appears in the film's preview trailer but not in the final release.

Home video
In 2010, Warner Bros. Home Video released the film on DVD and digital download as part of its Warner Archive Collection.

Cast

Julius Erving - Moses Guthrie
Jonathan Winters - H.S. and Harvey Tilson
Meadowlark Lemon - Rev. Grady Jackson
Jack Kehoe - Setshot
Margaret Avery - Toby Millman
James Bond III - Tyrone Millman
Michael V. Gazzo - Harry the Trainer
Peter Isacksen - Driftwood
Dwayne Mooney - Benny Rae
Daryl Mooney - Kenny Rae
Nicholas Pryor - George Brockington
M. Emmet Walsh - Wally Cantrell
Stockard Channing - Mona Mondieu
Flip Wilson - Coach 'Jock' Delaney
Debbie Allen - Ola
Dee Dee Bridgewater - Brandy
Julius Carry - Malik Jamal Truth
Jerry Chambers - Lucian Tucker
Jessie Lawrence Ferguson - Jackhammer Washington
Malek Abdul Mansour - Bullet Haines
Richard Foronjy - Mike
Clayton Hill - Security Guard
Eric Mercury - Rudy and League Commissioner
Branscombe Richmond - Winston Running Hawk
Joe Seneca - Mr. Sweets
Harry Shearer - Murray Sports

As themselves
Marv Albert
Chick Hearn
The Sylvers
The Spinners (As Deacon Smith and featured Singers)
Gene Steratore, Sr. As Referee

Basketball teams

Los Angeles:
Jerry Tarkanian - coach (also the film's consultant)
Ron Carter
Connie Hawkins
Lou Hudson
Kareem Abdul-Jabbar
Luther Rackley
Norm Nixon
New York:
Alfred Beard Jr.
Luther "Ticky" Burden
Spencer Haywood
Lonnie Shelton
Mychal Thompson
Boston:
John Williamson
Donald Chaney
Cedric "Cornbread" Maxwell
Kevin Stacom
Curtis Rowe
Detroit:  
Leon Douglas
Christopher J. Ford
Bob Lanier
John Shumate
Eric Money
Kevin Porter

References

External links
 
 
 
 Frank Deford review for Sports Illustrated
 Unofficial Website - TheFishThatSavedPittsburgh.com

1979 films
1970s sports comedy films
1970s fantasy comedy films
American basketball films
American sports comedy films
Films set in Pittsburgh
Films shot in Pennsylvania
Sports in Pittsburgh
United Artists films
American fantasy comedy films
1979 comedy films
1970s English-language films
1970s American films
Films about astrology